Miss Venezuela 2021 was the 68th edition of the Miss Venezuela pageant held on October 28, 2021 at the Estudio 1 de Venevisión in Caracas, Venezuela. Mariángel Villasmil, Miss Venezuela 2020, crowned Amanda Dudamel as her successor at the end of the event.
She represented Venezuela at the Miss Universe 2022 competition, placing as the 1st Runner-Up.

Results

Placements
Color key

Miss Venezuela World
The Miss Venezuela World was held as a separate competition. The winner will represent Venezuela at Miss World 2023.
Color key

Interactive Beauty Gala
The following awards will give by fan vote on the official website.

Judges
The judges for the final telecast include:

Mirla Castellanos – Singer, actress, composer and entertainer
Yenni Peña – Specialist in Corporate Social Responsibility consulting and human rights promoter
María Laura García – Journalist, radio host and TV presenter
Daniela Alvarado – Actress
Leo Aldana – Actor, model, entertainer, producer and broadcaster
Fran Beaufrand – Photographer
Yulimar Rojas – Athlete and current Olympic champion

Contestants 
18 contestants from 14 states, 3 regions, and the Capital District competed for the title.

Notes

References

External links
Miss Venezuela Official Website

Miss Venezuela
2021 beauty pageants
2021 in Venezuela
October 2021 events in Venezuela